The Bethel House is a historic house at Erwin and 2nd Streets in Des Arc, Arkansas.  It is a -story wood-frame structure, with a side-gable roof and weatherboard siding.  The front of the house is dominated by a broad cross gable, beneath which is a recessed porch, supported by groups of columns set on fieldstone piers.  The house was designed by Charles L. Thompson and built in 1918; it is a fine example of small-scale residential architecture Thompson produced.

The house was listed on the National Register of Historic Places in 1982.

See also
National Register of Historic Places listings in Prairie County, Arkansas

References

American Craftsman architecture in Arkansas
Bungalow architecture in Arkansas
Houses on the National Register of Historic Places in Arkansas
Houses completed in 1918
Houses in Prairie County, Arkansas
National Register of Historic Places in Prairie County, Arkansas
1918 establishments in Arkansas